Moritz Seiffert (born 4 November 2000) is a German professional footballer who plays as a winger for  club Viktoria Berlin.

References

External links

2000 births
Living people
German footballers
Association football wingers
FC St. Pauli players
SSV Jeddeloh players
FC Viktoria 1889 Berlin players
3. Liga players
Regionalliga players